Jacek Waldemar Bąk (born 24 March 1973) is a Polish former professional footballer who played as a central defender.

Other than his country, he competed in France, Qatar and Austria, notably appearing in more than 150 competitive games for Lyon and contributing to win the 2002 national championship.

Bąk represented Poland for 15 years, appearing for the nation in two World Cups and Euro 2008.

Since 2004 he is a French citizen.

Club career
Born in Lublin, Bąk made his senior debuts with local Motor Lublin aged just 16, moving to Lech Poznań two years later. In the 1992–93 season, he contributed with 28 games to help the latter club win its third national championship in four years.

Bąk signed for Olympique Lyonnais in the 1995 summer, going on to spend one full decade in the French Ligue 1 with that team and RC Lens, joining the latter in January 2002. The sides he played for during that campaign finished in first and second position.

Bąk retired in June 2010 at the age of 37, after two years in the Qatar Stars League with Al-Rayyan SC and three with Austrian Bundesliga's Austria Wien.

International career
Bąk gained his first cap for the Poland national team on 1 February 1993, in a 0–0 away friendly draw with Cyprus. He was picked for the squads that competed in the 2002 (one appearance, a 2–0 group stage loss to co-hosts South Korea) and the 2006 FIFA World Cups, with both tournaments ending in elimination after three matches.

In November 2006, Bąk claimed he was offered €10,000 to concede a penalty in a UEFA Euro 2008 qualifier between Belgium and Poland in the former's favour, and UEFA opened an investigation. Selected for the finals by manager Leo Beenhakker, he was left out of the final group phase clash against Croatia, and retired with 96 appearances, fourth-most at the time.

Career statistics

Scores and results list Poland's goal tally first, score column indicates score after each Bąk goal.

Honours
Lyon
 UEFA Intertoto Cup: 1997

References

External links

 
  
 
 National team data 
 
 
 

1973 births
Living people
Sportspeople from Lublin
Polish footballers
French footballers
Polish emigrants to France
Naturalized citizens of France
Association football defenders
Ekstraklasa players
Motor Lublin players
Lech Poznań players
Ligue 1 players
Olympique Lyonnais players
RC Lens players
Qatar Stars League players
Al-Rayyan SC players
Austrian Football Bundesliga players
FK Austria Wien players
Poland international footballers
2002 FIFA World Cup players
2006 FIFA World Cup players
UEFA Euro 2008 players
Polish expatriate footballers
Expatriate footballers in Qatar
Expatriate footballers in Austria
Polish expatriate sportspeople in Qatar
Polish expatriate sportspeople in Austria
French expatriate sportspeople in Qatar
French expatriate sportspeople in Austria